The Amur-class minelayers were the first purpose-built, ocean-going minelayers in the world. The class consisted of two vessels: Amur and Yenisei. Both ships were constructed for the Imperial Russian Navy in the late 1890s. During the Russo-Japanese War of 1904–05 they were assigned to the Pacific Fleet. Yenisei struck one of her own mines two days after the war began while laying a minefield and sank. Amur was sunk by Japanese howitzers in December 1904 after the Japanese had gained control of the heights around Port Arthur. She was later salvaged and scrapped by the Japanese.

Design and description
The Amur-class minelayers were designed to drop their mines while at high speed and were given a pronounced, overhanging, stern that allowed the mines to be dropped behind the propellers through doors in the stern. Each door was served by a rail that led directly to the mine storage compartments.

They had two pole masts and a ram bow.

The ships had two vertical triple expansion steam engines, each powering one propeller. Twelve Belleville water-tube boilers provided steam.

The main armament of the Amur-class ships consisted of five  Canet Pattern 1892 50-caliber guns. The rate of fire was between twelve and fifteen rounds per minute. The ships also mounted seven  Hotchkiss guns. The Amur-class ships mounted one  torpedo tube and carried 300 mines.

Service
Both ships, Amur and Yenisei, were built by the Baltic Works in Saint Petersburg. They were laid down in 1898 and completed the following year. They were assigned to the Pacific Fleet when the Russo-Japanese War began in 1904 and based in Port Arthur. Two days after the Japanese surprise attack on Port Arthur on 8/9 February 1904, Yenisei was laying a minefield at Dalian Bay when one mine broke loose and began floating towards the ship. While maneuvering to avoid the mine Yenisei accidentally entered the minefield that she'd just laid and hit a mine. The consequent explosion caused eight mines still on the rails to detonate, killing 96 or 100 crewmen and sinking the ship in 20 minutes. The protected cruiser  and four destroyers responded to the incident, but Boyarin hit one of Yeniseis mines. The explosion flooded the ship's machinery spaces and her crew abandoned ship. The cruiser remained afloat, but foundered in Dalian Bay the next day during a storm.

They encountered a field of 50 mines laid by Amur the evening before. Hatsuse hit one mine that disabled her engines and steering and drifted into another mine that caused one of her forward magazines to detonate. The ship sank in about 90 seconds, taking 496 men down with her. Yashima struck another mine as she maneuvered around the drifting Hatsuse, but she was towed away from the minefield. By the late afternoon Yashimas flooding had become unstoppable and she was abandoned by her crew. Three hours later the ship capsized and sank.

Amur was subsequently besieged in Port Arthur and hit in drydock a number of times by  howitzer shells on 8 December 1904. She was knocked over on her port side and rested on the side of the dock at an angle of 68°. On 18 December she was hit again by 30 shells and sunk on her side. The Japanese later raised the ship and scrapped it.

See also
 Timeline of Russian inventions and technology records

References

External links

Minelayers
Ships of the Imperial Russian Navy